Charmaine Bingwa (born 13 November 1985) is an Australian actress. She is known for her role as Carmen Moyo in the CBS series The Good Fight (2021–2022). She starred in Antoine Fuqua's film Emancipation (2022) as Dodienne, wife of Peter (Will Smith). She received critical praise for being “unflinching as the film’s emotional pillar" and "incredibly moving," many even hoped "the Academy won’t overlook such a breakout talent "

Bingwa will next appear as Isisa, a fierce and formidable warrior in King Shaka, also Executive Produced by Antoine Fuqua. She has also starred in Black Box as Miranda Brooks, part of Amazon's Welcome to the Blumhouse anthology film series. Bingwa won the 2018 Heath Ledger Scholarship award. She also voiced Felicia Cox in both seasons of QCode's successful podcast, The Burned Photo.

Early life and acting career 
Bingwa was born in Perth, Western Australia. She began her career as a singer, but when completing her Bachelor of Music at university, until she took acting as one of her final electives. She completed the acting course in addition to her music degree and signed with an acting agent soon after graduating. She won critical acclaim in the stage role Doubt: A Parable starring as Mrs. Muller, for which she received a Sydney Theatre Awards nomination. In 2018, she won the Australian Media, Entertainment and Arts Alliance Scholarship to study at the Atlantic Theater Company in New York and then won the Heath Ledger Scholarship, becoming the first woman of colour and openly gay recipient. Bingwa also starred, wrote, produced and co-directed the series Little Sista, which won the LGBT Toronto Film Festival.  

Her role (Carmen Moyo) in The Good Fight was acclaimed as a "gust of chilly Chicago wind, quickly letting you know who's boss here"; she "made a splash upon joining Reddick & Associates", the fictional Chicago law firm in which she plays a talented, quick-witted, cool, gay, and morally complex junior lawyer. Many labelled Bingwa as "the season’s standout performer” in The Good Fight Season 6.

Awards

Filmography 
 2018: Nekrotronic
 2018: Hello Au Revoir
 2018: Little Sista (TV series, 7 episodes, also writer and director)
 2020: Black Box
 2021: The Pitch
 2021: The Good Fight (TV series)
 2022: Emancipation
 2022: Trees of Peace
 2022: KAPŌ

References

External links 
 

Living people
Australian film actresses
Actresses from Perth, Western Australia
Australian people of Zimbabwean descent
Australian lesbian actresses
Australian actors of African descent
21st-century Australian LGBT people
1985 births